Lochbuie may refer to:

Lochbuie, Mull, Scotland
Lochbuie, Colorado, United States
Lochbuie Road, Highland, Scotland

See also
, a Caledonian MacBrayne ferry
Loch Buidhe (disambiguation)